The 2013 Canad Inns Prairie Classic was held from October 18 to 21 at the Portage Curling Club in Portage la Prairie, Manitoba as part of the 2013–14 World Curling Tour. The event was held in a triple-knockout format, and the purse for the event was CAD$60,000, of which the winner, Mike McEwen, received CAD$18,000. McEwen defeated Glenn Howard in the final with a score of 6–2.

Teams
The teams are listed as follows:

Knockout results
The draw is listed as follows:

A event

B event

C event

Playoffs

References

External links

2013 in curling